Shobonier is an unincorporated community, located on U.S. Route 51, about 10 miles south of Vandalia in Fayette County, Illinois. The population for the Shobonier ZIP code area, including rural areas surrounding the community, was 839 at the 2010 census.

The community was named after a local Indian chieftain.

References

Unincorporated communities in Fayette County, Illinois
Unincorporated communities in Illinois